The Four Feathers is a 1978 British television film adaptation of the classic 1902 novel The Four Feathers by novelist A. E. W. Mason. Directed by Don Sharp, this version starred Beau Bridges, Robert Powell, Simon Ward and Jane Seymour, and was nominated for a Primetime Emmy Award. It follows the novel almost exactly, and response to the film was very positive.

Plot
Lieutenant Harry Faversham (Beau Bridges) is the latest scion of a prominent military family. A deeply sensitive boy, he is much traumatised by the early death of his kind-hearted mother. Though he never wants to be a soldier, he feels obliged to join the army. Though no coward (as he will later show), he has no interest in an army career. Having met and become engaged to Ethne, he decides to resign his commission. The fact that war in the Sudan is coming is irrelevant to this decision. During their engagement ball on the final day of his army career, Faversham receives telegrammes summoning him and three of his brother officers (Durrance, Willoughby and Trench) back to the regiment prior to being sent to the Sudan. As determined as ever to leave the army, Faversham burns the telegrammes so that he can pretend not to have been summoned back to the regiment before his commission expires. Willoughby sees him burning papers and notices that he is embarrassed to have been taken by surprise in doing so. On later realising that Faversham was burning the telegrams from the army, Willoughby assumes that Faversham has done so because he is afraid of going to the Sudan. Durrance, Willoughby and Trench then send Faversham three white feathers, betokening cowardice, and turn their backs on him. When Faversham tries to explain to Ethne what has happened, she also reaches the same mistaken conclusion and gives him a fourth white feather. Following his regiment's deployment, Faversham realizes he has made a grave mistake and, having toyed with suicide, finally resolves to redeem his honour.

Disguising himself as an Arab, Faversham makes his way to the Sudan determined to perform three acts of courage that will persuade each of his former comrades to take back their white feathers. He learns of an impending attack on the regiment, and tries to make it in time to save them. During the battle, his closest friend Captain Jack Durrance (Powell) becomes engaged in close combat, during which he is blinded when a black-powder rifle goes off next to his face. Faversham attacks the Arabs who surround Durrance, and rescues him as he staggers blindly. In the end, Faversham is able to help his regiment, and redeem his honour.

Cast
 Beau Bridges as Harry Faversham
 Robert Powell as Jack Durrance
 Simon Ward as William Trench
 Jane Seymour as Ethne Eustace
 Harry Andrews as Gen. Faversham
 Richard Johnson as Abou Fatma
 David Robb as Thomas Willoughby
 Richard Beale as Wembol (valet)
 Robin Bailey as Col. Eustace
 John Hallam  as Sergeant Major
 Julian Barnes as Lt. Bradley
 Mary Maude as Mrs. Faversham
 Frank Gatliff as Old major
 Robert Flemyng as Old colonel
 Robert James as John (the butler)

Production
The film was produced by Norman Rosemont, who specialised in making adaptations of classic tales for television. He had recently made The Man in the Iron Mask, Captains Courageous and The Count of Monte Cristo. The films would be made for over $1 million which was more than US networks would pay for them, but they could be released theatrically overseas. "The great classic authors wrote good stories with strong plots about people you could care for", said Rosemont. "And filming them at length – usually three hours – you can get most of the plot in."

The Four Feathers was, like Captains Courageous, a Bell special for the ABC (i.e. it was sponsored by Bell Systems).

Norman Rosemont normally filmed works in the public domain but he had to pay London Films $150,000 for the rights to Four Feathers.

Part of the money was provided by Trident Films, an off-shot of Trident Television, a Leeds-based regional television group.

Director Don Sharp was known for his action films. He had been working on several feature film that failed to raise finance when he was offered the job of directing The Four Feathers; Sharp was initially reluctant to do a remake but liked the script and had a very positive experience.

The casting of Powell and Bridges was announced in July 1977. Bridges had a dialect coach, Robert Easton, to help him with the accent.

Filming started in August 1977 and took place in England and Spain. The Duke of Wellington's estate was used for English scenes. The desert sequences were shot in Almería, Spain over three weeks. During the Spanish part of filming, Powell referred to occasions when the unit was affected by sandstorms, saying, "Everyone wore surgical masks and goggles and was covered from head to foot, except the bloody actors".

Sharp enjoyed working with Beau Bridges and Robert Powell. He had a more difficult relationship with producer Norman Rosemont, who Sharp said would get paranoid and argumentative. Sharp did greatly respect Rosemont's story skills and showmanship.

Reception

Critical
The Los Angeles Times praised it as "a large, sumptuous movie in the grand, romantic tradition... staged with fine sweep and power by Don Sharp from a meticulous adaptation". The Christian Science Monitor called it "rollicking entertainment."

A New York Times reviewer wrote: "Mr. Bridges is quite effective as the bearded adventurer, and the action scenes are jolly good, if you will. 'Four Feathers' may possibly be the bloodiest pacifist lesson ever devised, but its grand posturing and silly sentiments work nicely."

The Monthly Film Bulletin called it "a museum piece, brought up from the vaults, dusted down and carefully mounted."

Ratings
It was the 28th highest rated show of the week on American television.

References

External links
 
 
 
The Four Feathers at BFI

1978 television films
1978 films
British adventure films
British television films
Films based on The Four Feathers
Films directed by Don Sharp
Films set in the 1890s
Films shot in Almería
1970s war films
1970s adventure films
1970s English-language films
1970s British films